Av Pak (also pronounced Aao Pak) is a traditional blouse-dress worn by women in Cambodia. Its literal translation is embroidery shirt in English.The blouse shared many attributes with the Kebaya blouse-dress of Indonesia, including the elaborate embroidered gold-threads used in formal versions of the Kebaya. It is usually worn with the Sampot Hol, a garment worn around the lower body which sometimes uses a more formal and elegant gold thread in the Khmer tradition. However, the Sarong is still frequently used with the Av Pak by ethnic Chams and Javanese in the poor and rural parts of the country.

The Khmer people consider the Av Pak to be a classic yet modern suit-dress which uses traditional Cambodian embroidery. In the 21st century, the blouse has come to be considered the national garment of Cambodia. Traditional upper garments have lost their popularity among Cambodian women. The Av Bopock, a tube shirt or tube dress is too closely associated with the Cham people, an ethnic minority in Cambodia and the Sabai, a shawl-like shoulder wrap dating back to the Khmer Empire era, is now considered too immodest because of the thin cloth used in the garment and the style of baring one shoulder when wearing the Sabai.

Gallery

See also
 Kebaya
 Khmer Traditional Dress
 Culture of Cambodia

References

External links
collection of Av Pak in various style

Cambodian clothing
Tops (clothing)
Embroidery